The Federação de Futebol do Estado do Rio de Janeiro, usually known by the acronyms FERJ and FFERJ, manages all the official football tournaments within the state of Rio de Janeiro including the Campeonato Carioca, the Campeonato Carioca Série B1, the Copa Rio, and the Campeonato Carioca de Futebol Feminino. It was founded in 1978.

History

On March 15, 1975, the states of Guanabara, which consisted essentially only of the city of Rio de Janeiro and until 1960 the federal capital district of Brasil, and Rio de Janeiro, the non-metropolitan area of the state of Rio de Janeiro were merged into the current State of Rio de Janeiro. On September 29, 1978, the Federação de Futebol do Estado do Rio de Janeiro was founded by the merger of the Federação Carioca de Futebol (Carioca Football Federation, FCF) in the state of Guanabara and the Federação Fluminense de Desportos (Fluminense Sports Federation, FFD) in the state of Rio de Janeiro. Octávio Pinto Guimarães, who was FCF's president, was chosen as FERJ's first president.

In 1979, the Federação de Futebol do Estado do Rio de Janeiro organized two different state championships, both won by Flamengo. Those competitions were the first competitions organized by FERJ.

Presidents

Current clubs in Brasileirão
As of 2022 season. Common team names are noted in bold.

See also
 Confederação Brasileira de Futebol
 Campeonato Carioca
 Campeonato Carioca Second Division
 Campeonato Carioca Third Division

References

External links 
  Federação de Futebol do Estado do Rio de Janeiro official website

Rio de Janeiro
 
Sports organizations established in 1978